Ataxioceratidae is an extinct Ammonite cephalopod family included in the superfamily Perisphinctoidea. These fast-moving nektonic carnivores lived during the Jurassic and Cretaceous periods.

Genera

Catutosphinctes
Choicensisphinctes
Katroliceras
Lithacoceras
Lithacosphinctes
Orthosphinctes

Distribution
Fossils of species within this genus have been found in the Cretaceous of Yemen, as well as in Jurassic sediments of Antarctica, Argentina, Canada, China, Cuba, France, Germany, Hungary, India, Iran, Italy, Madagascar, Nepal, Somalia, Spain, United States.

References

Ammonitida families
Perisphinctoidea
Jurassic ammonites
Cretaceous ammonites
Oxfordian first appearances
Early Cretaceous extinctions